Enrique Llopis Doménech (born 15 October 2000) is a Spanish athlete who specializes in the 110m hurdles.

Personal bests

Outdoors
 110 metres hurdles:	13.30 (Munich, 2022)

Indoors
 60 metres hurdles:	7.48   (Madrid, 2022)

International competitions

References

External links
 

2000 births
Living people
Spanish male hurdlers
People from Gandia
Sportspeople from the Province of Valencia